The 1908 United States presidential election in Oklahoma took place on November 3, 1908. All 46 states were part of the 1908 United States presidential election. Voters chose seven electors to the Electoral College, who voted for president and vice president. This was the first presidential election Oklahoma participated in, as it had become the 46th state on November 16, 1907.

Democratic Nominee William Jennings Bryan won Oklahoma by a 4.66% margin of victory, establishing Oklahoma as a Democratic stronghold, a position it would hold for several decades. Prior to 1960, it consistently voted Democratic in presidential elections outside of a few Republican landslides. After Lyndon B. Johnson carried the state during his 1964 landslide, it never voted for a Democratic presidential nominee again.

Eugene V. Debs, the Socialist candidate, won 8.52% of the vote, demonstrating the strength of the Socialist movement in Oklahoma at this point in the state's history. Debs would go on to improve this performance in 1912, winning around twice as much of the percentage of the vote in Oklahoma.

This was one of only two elections in which Oklahoma County, home to the city of Oklahoma City, voted for a candidate that lost the state.

Results

Results by county

See also
 United States presidential elections in Oklahoma

References

Oklahoma
1908
1908 Oklahoma elections